Adult Material is a four-part British drama television series concerning a woman's life working in the adult film industry  Starring Hayley Squires and created by an all female team, it first aired on Channel 4 on 5 October 2020.

Adult industry professionals Rebecca More and Danny D were advisors and coaches for the series, with Danny having a small part in episode two, as journalist Sam Pike.

Synopsis
The series follows Hayley Burrows, ostensibly an ordinary hardworking mum-of-three who has been working as Jolene Dollar in the adult entertainment industry for many years. Her life is dramatically changed by an incident between Amy, a new girl in the industry and an American hardcore actor, Tom Pain.

Jolene meets MP Stella Maitland on a talk show, just before Stella is exposed for downloading porn on her work computer. With her home life falling apart and facing health issues, Jolene decides to quit the industry and gets a job in a coffee bar.

While facing a defamation trial for speaking out about Amy's treatment, Jolene, now supported by the disgraced Stella, goes to extreme lengths to save her family from financial ruin.

Main cast

Episodes

Reception
The series received positive reviews and a 92% Rotten Tomatoes score, Lucy Mangan of The Guardian gave it four stars, calling it "Perfect drama", while James Walton of The Spectator called it "Funny, tender and properly horrible".  The show received four BAFTA nominations including Best Mini-Series and Best Actress, for Hayley Squires.

References

External links
 
 Adult Material at Channel 4.com

2020 British television series debuts
2020 British television series endings
2020s British drama television series
2020s British television miniseries
Channel 4 miniseries
Channel 4 television dramas
English-language television shows
Works about pornography
Television series by Banijay